This is a list of the National Register of Historic Places listings in Sutton County, Texas.

This is intended to be a complete list of properties and districts listed on the National Register of Historic Places in Sutton County, Texas. There are three properties  listed on the National Register in the county. Two of these are Recorded Texas Historic Landmarks including one that is also a State Antiquities Landmark.

Current listings

The locations of National Register properties may be seen in a mapping service provided.

|}

See also

National Register of Historic Places listings in Texas
Recorded Texas Historic Landmarks in Sutton County

References

External links

Sutton County, Texas
Sutton County
Buildings and structures in Sutton County, Texas